Miss Earth 2017, the 17th edition of the Miss Earth pageant, with the theme "Heroines fighting climate change", was held on November 4, 2017 at the Mall of Asia Arena in Pasay, Metro Manila, Philippines. Katherine Espín of Ecuador crowned her successor Karen Ibasco of the Philippines at the end of the event. This is the fourth time Philippines won Miss Earth - the most in the pageant's history.

Results

Placements

NOTE (*): For this year's pageant, there were no "1st, 2nd and 3rd Runner-up".  Instead, the non-winning Elemental Queens were of equal ranking (they are all the Runners-up), with each being eligible to replace the winner in the event that would be necessary. Therefore, the ordinal numbers 1st, 2nd and 3rd before the word Runner-Up here are only formal.

Order of announcements

Top 16

Top 8

Top 4

Winning answer

Judges
The judges for the pageant coronation night and live telecast include:
 Cory Tran – International fashion designer based in New York and Vietnam
 Lorraine Schuck – Executive Vice President of Carousel Productions Inc. Philippines
 Ramon Monzon – President of Carousel Productions Inc. and CEO of Philippine Stock Exchange - Philippines
 Michele Roget – CEO of Earthly Guardians Philippines
 Peachy Veneracion – Project Director of Carousel Productions Inc. Philippines
 Salvador Medialdea – Executive Secretary of the Republic of the Philippines
 Teresita Herbosa – Chairperson of Securities and Exchange Commission Philippines
 Carlos Cesar "Lito" Mercado – CEO of Quantuvis Resources Corp. and Executive Vice President of Joy~Nostalg Group Philippines
 Sudesh Puthran – Managing Director of Mindshare Philippines
 Shontelle – Grammy-nominated songwriter and international R&B singer
 Vyacheslav Shakel – Chairman and CEO of e-Chat International

Preliminary rounds

Figure and Form

Beauty of Face and Poise

Intelligence and Environmental Awareness

Pre-pageant activities

Medal tally
To sort this table by delegate, total medal count, or any other column, click on the  icon next to the column title.

Medalists

Special awards

Miss Earth Hannah's
A special mini-pageant was held on October 14 at Hannah's Beach Resort and Convention Center, Pagudpud, Ilocos Norte. Ten selected candidates competed in swimsuit competition, long gown competition and question and answer portion. Here are the results:

Miss Earth Hannah's 2017
  – Paweensuda Drouin
1st Runner-Up
  – Ninoska Vásquez
2nd Runner-Up
  – Lessie Giler Sanchez
Best in Swimsuit
  – Ninoska Vásquez
Best in Long Gown
  – Paweensuda Drouin
Other Delegates
  – Bianca Kronsteiner
  – Iva Uchytilová
  – Maria José Castañeda
  – Elian Qupty
  – Hannah Lee
  – Camilla Fogestedt
  – Josephine Mutesi

Delegates 
Listed below are the 85 delegates that have competed for the title:

Notes

Returns

Last competed in 2005:
 

Last competed in 2008:

 

Last competed in 2010:
 

Last competed in 2014:
 
 

Last competed in 2015:

Withdrawals

Replacements
 — Kimberly Driege has been replaced by Lauralyn Vermeersch. Kimberly has to recover from the tragic disaster caused by the earthquake in Mexico where she lives.
 — Bruna Vizintin, the original winner of Miss Brazil Earth 2017 pageant, was dethroned by the new organization because she was unable to agree with some duties on her contract. Yasmin Engelke, the 4th runner-up was announced as Brasil's representative this year.
 — Paula Ethel Masopeh was replaced by Maud Fadi due to health problems.
 — Ismatu Daramy replaced Claudia Josephine Suma, a finalist at the recently concluded Miss Earth Sierra Leone 2017 who supposedly replaced Esther Williams following Esther's indication of her inability to participate and represent Sierra Leone at the upcoming Miss Earth 2017 pageant.
 – Noemí Sartal has been dethroned and was replaced by Ainara de Santamaría Villamor, the 2nd runner-up from the national pageant

Did not compete
   — Tania Nunes
  —  Dayna Layne
  —  Victoria Selivanov — competed in Miss International 2017 but unplaced.
  — Anja Chemnitz
  —  Emma Sheedy — did not meet the minimum age requirement but will compete in Miss Earth 2018 instead.
  —  Anaika Gaspard — attended the preliminary activities but withdrew before the pageant night.
  —  Andina Pura — competed in The Miss Globe 2017 and awarded Miss Photogenic.
  —  Wokie Dolo — competed in Miss World 2017 and placed Top 40.
  —  Christina Chalk — was not able to compete due to schedule conflicts.
  —  Irini Moutzouris — attended the preliminary activities but didn't attended the finals for not meeting the minimum height requirement.
  —  Lilian Loth

Broadcasters

See also 
Miss Universe 2017
Miss World 2017
Miss International 2017

References

External links
 

2017
2017 beauty pageants
Beauty pageants in the Philippines
2017 in the Philippines